Enock Hill Turnock (1857–1926) was an American architect, originally from England.

Family background
Enock was born on February 27, 1857, in London, England to Richard and Elizabeth (Hill) Turnock. His father made several trips to America and in 1871 moved his family on the Cuba. They arrived in New York City after several weeks at sea.

After visiting with friends and relatives, they settled in Elkhart, Indiana in 1872. Enock Hill attended grammar schools in Elkhart as well as high school at the age of 15. It was once explained by Mrs. E.H. Turnock Jr., the origin of the spelling of Enock with a “k” rather than the common spelling with an “h”, she said, “I have been told, that the London family had a son Enoch who died in infancy, but the parents like the name, and named their next son Enock, to distinguish him in family records. Enock was mostly known as E. Hill but his brothers called him ‘Nock’.” E. Hill Turnock spent his early years in Elkhart, Indiana where he accepted employment with the Lakeshore railroad.

Early career
Here he worked his way up to head pattern maker. His inclinations and his early talents indicated his career for him when a young man. Part of his training was acquired in the Art Institute of Chicago, and for nine years he was with the noted Chicago architect, William Le Baron Jenney. Afterwards, he established his own firm in Chicago until 1907, when he returned to Elkhart, Indiana.

Influences
William Le Baron Jenney
Henry Hobson Richardson
Louis Sullivan
Daniel H. Burnham
These architects were among the most influential American architects in the later 19th and early 20th centuries.

Later years
When Enock Hill Turnock returned to Elkhart he opened his own architectural firm where he designed many finer buildings which included homes, factories, and public buildings. Some of these buildings included the Elkhart City Hall, Elkhart General Hospital, Elkhart High School, the Elkhart Masonic Temple, Elkhart Public Library, a Presbyterian Church, Christian Science Church, the YWCA building, and the Water Company building. Turnock's other structures include the A.R. Beardsley Mausoleum in the Grace Lawn cemetery, the Rice Cemetery office, and many residential homes located throughout the city of Elkhart. On the other hand, the most recognized and famous home built in Elkhart is the Ruthmere, which was originally built for Mr. and Mrs. A.R. Beardsley.

Turnock was a member of the Tyrian and Royal Lodge of Masons, Christiana Country Club, Atherton Club, the old Century Club, and the American Institute of Architects. He also served as the first president of the Indiana Society of Architects. Enock Hill Turnock was honored with a fellowship in the American Institute of Architects. Turnock received the only honorary member of the state association for the Indiana Society of Architects.

For some time, Enock Hill Turnock had been ill with kidney troubles. He spent approximately seven months at the Mayo Hospital in Rochester, Minnesota before returning to Ft. Wayne, Indiana. Enock Hill Turnock and his wife returned to Ft. Wayne to live with his wife's two sisters. Enock Hill Turnock died with kidney trouble approximately two months after returning home from the Mayo Hospital.

Enoch Hill Turnock designed many upscale residential homes, finer buildings, churches and businesses in Chicago, Illinois; Elkhart, Indiana; surrounding cities and even, in Whitby, Canada. An extensive list of structures credited to E. Hill Turnock as well as a listing of all structures believed to be designed by Turnock, but not verified, can found at the Robert B. Beardsley Arts Reference Library at the Ruthmere Museum in Elkhart.

Work
Following is a list of notable properties created by Enoch Hill Turnock.

Brewster Apartments, Chicago, Illinois. Formerly known as Lincoln Park Palace.
Built in 1893, this building was constructed with dark masonry polished Jasper walls that gave way to an airy interior distinguished by spacious cast-iron stairways, open elevator cages, glass blocks embedded in walkways and a massive skylight.
Ruthmere Mansion, Elkhart, Indiana. Formerly Albert and Elizabeth Beardsley Residence.
Built in 1910, this three story mansion built in Beaux Art style is Elkhart's most prominent historical residence. Refurbished in the early 1970s, the Ruthmere Mansion is now open to the public as a museum home.
Havilah Beardsley Memorial, Elkhart, Indiana.
Located a short distance from the former Beardsley Residence is a monument designed by E. Hill Turnock and dedicated to Havilah Beardsley, the area's first doctor, and the founder of the City of Elkhart. It was commissioned by his nephew A.R. Beardsley. Turnock's influence is easily recognized by the large stone flower bowls which border the monument.

References

Bibliography 
 Ruthmere Foundation Inc., Newsletter, Fall 2006
 Stephenson T. (1972, July 22). "An ode of praise to E. Hill Turnock". A.M., The Elkhart Truth, pp. 3, 4, 5, 6, 7, 8.
 "Succumbs. (1926, July 6). E. Hill Turnock Dies at Age of 70". The Elkhart Truth, Obituary
 Turnock Committee. (1996). Discovering Turnock. Pamphlet from Ruthmere Museum
 Abraham Weaver: Standard History of Elkhart County (vol.2, pp. 899–901 (Ind 977.281 W36)
 Funk, Laura. Docent, Ruthmere House Museum. August 10, 2007.
 http://www.ruthmere.org/architecture
 http://www.nationalhistoricalregister.com/IN/elkhart/state.html
 https://web.archive.org/web/20070927220149/http://www.historicalandmarks.org/noted/LOM/lom05archive.html
 https://web.archive.org/web/20070829225337/http://www.artseverywhere.com/
 
 https://web.archive.org/web/20070813222820/http://www.bc.edu/bc_org/avp/cas/fnart/fa267/1893fair.html

1857 births
1926 deaths
19th-century American architects
English emigrants to the United States
People from Elkhart, Indiana
20th-century American architects